Burgos, officially the Municipality of Burgos, is a 4th class municipality in the province of Isabela, Philippines. According to the 2020 census, it has a population of 26,040 people.

Geography

Barangays
Burgos is politically subdivided into 14 barangays.. These barangays are headed by elected officials: Barangay Captain, Barangay Council, whose members are called Barangay Councilors. All are elected every three years.

Only one barangay is considered urban (highlighted in bold).

Climate

Demographics

Economy 

Economic activities mainly consists of farming. It is one of the highest rice and corn producer among towns of Isabela province.

Government

Local government
The municipality is governed by a mayor designated as its local chief executive and by a municipal council as its legislative body in accordance with the Local Government Code. The mayor, vice mayor, and the councilors are elected directly by the people through an election which is being held every three years.

Elected officials

The election for the mayoral post on May 9, 2016, Kervin Francis G. Uy, an incumbent Liga Ng mga Barangay (LnB) President from Barangay Catabban, defeated Simplicio N. Domingo, II, then Board Member of the 2nd District Isabela, by 2,131 votes. Ruben A. Tegui, a 3rd term Municipal Mayor run for Vice Mayor defeating the incumbent Municipal Vice Mayor Fred S. Dela Cruz. The following were the elected Sangguniang Bayan Members of the Municipality:
 Ansley Val C. Tegui - 2nd term
 Roderick C. Gamayon - 2nd term
 Myrna P. Reglos - 1st term
 Emmanuel S. Lopez - Last term
 Heinrich D. Espejo - 2nd term
 Martin S. Agtarap - Last term
 Felixnaldo B. Alabon, Sr. - 2nd term
 Alexander F. Agliam - 1st term

Congress representation
Burgos, belonging to the fifth legislative district of the province of Isabela, currently represented by Hon. Faustino Michael Carlos T. Dy III.

List of former chief executives
The following are the list of mayors who served the Municipality of Burgos:
 Ruben A. Tegui - July 2007 to June 2016
 Felixnaldo B. Alabon, Sr. - July 2004 - June 2007
 Evelyn P. Alabon - July 2001 to June 2004
 Felixnaldo B. Alabon, Sr. - July 1992 - June 2001
 Liborio G. Garcia - July 1988 - June 1992
 Procopio C. Mangabo, Sr. - January 11 to February 11, 1988 (Appointed)
 Claro F. Aglibut - August 1986 - January 1988
 Liborio G. Garcia - 1971 to July 1986
 Perfecto Dela Cruz - 1968 to 1971.

Education
The Schools Division of Isabela governs the town's public education system. The division office is a field office of the DepEd in Cagayan Valley region. The office governs the public and private elementary and public and private high schools throughout the municipality.

Elementary

Secondary
 San Antonino National High School
 Burgos National High School
 Bacnor National High School
 Saint Peter's Academy

References

External links 
Municipal Profile at the National Competitiveness Council of the Philippines
at the Isabela Government Website
Local Governance Performance Management System
[ Philippine Standard Geographic Code]
Philippine Census Information

Municipalities of Isabela (province)